Yevhen Buinenko (born 20 September 1992) is a Ukrainian handball player for Orosházi FKSE and the Ukrainian national team.

He represented Ukraine at the 2020 European Men's Handball Championship.

References

1992 births
Living people
Ukrainian male handball players
Sportspeople from Zaporizhzhia
Expatriate handball players
Ukrainian expatriate sportspeople in Hungary
HC Motor Zaporizhia players
21st-century Ukrainian people